Du Zhixuan (born 15 October 2001) is a Chinese footballer currently playing as a midfielder for Henan Songshan Longmen.

Career statistics

Club
.

References

2001 births
Living people
Chinese footballers
Association football midfielders
Chinese Super League players
Henan Songshan Longmen F.C. players
21st-century Chinese people